HIFK Naiset, also known by the nickname Stadin Gimmat ('Girls of ,' a nickname for Helsinki), are an ice hockey team in the Naisten Liiga. They play in the Pirkkola district of Helsinki, at the Pirkkola Ice Hall. As the representative women's ice hockey team of the Helsinki-based multi-sport club HIFK, the team is closely affiliated with the HIFK men's ice hockey team of the Liiga.

One of the ten founding teams from the inaugural 1982–83 Naisten SM-sarja season, the original HIFK Naiset was financially relegated in 1989 and the club chose not to pursue women’s ice hockey for the following several decades. The current team was established in 2018 and gained promotion to the Naisten Liiga from the second-tier Naisten Mestis at the end of their debut season in 2018–19.

History

Original team, 1982–1989 
The team struggled early on, forced to compete with fellow Helsinki-based team Helsingin Jääkiekkoklubi (HJK) for top talent. HIFK finished in the bottom half of the league in their first five seasons, ranking seventh of ten teams in 1982–83, ninth of twelve in 1983–84, eighth of thirteen in 1984–85, fifth of eight in 1985–86, and sixth of eight in 1986–87. 

The team’s fortunes turned in the 1987–88 season and they earned a 7-2-5 (win-tie-loss) record with a +3 goal differential and claimed third place in the Naisten SM-sarja playoffs, earning Finnish Championship bronze. With a 1988–89 roster that included three members of the newly-created Finnish women's national ice hockey team – defencemen Johanna Ikonen and Maria Turki (Novitsky), and forward Ulla Saarikko – HIFK continued their upward trajectory, posting an 8-2-4 record with a +20 goal differential and claiming Finnish Championship bronze for the second consecutive season.  

Despite the marked improvement of the team, HIFK was financially relegated after the 1988–89 season and no senior women’s representative team or any programs for women and girls existed in the club for the following twenty-five years.

Season-by-season results 
This is a list of all seasons completed by HIFK Naiset, including the original HIFK Naiset (1982–1989) and Stadin Gimmat-HIFK Naiset (2018–present).

Note: Finish = Rank at end of regular season; GP = Games played, W = Wins (3 points), OTW = Overtime/shootout wins (2 points), T = Ties (1 point), OTL = Overtime/shootout losses (1 point), L = Losses, GF = Goals for, GA = Goals against, Pts = Points, Top scorer: Points (Goals+Assists)

Players and personnel

2022–23 roster 

Coaching staff and team personnel
 Head coach: Saara Niemi
 Goaltending coach: Tuukka Hämäläinen
 Video coach: Nikolas Sepponen
 Skills coach: Martin Andler
 Conditioning coach: Simon Dannapfel
 Conditioning coach: Joonas Lahtinen
 Conditioning coach: Margot Vander Ghinst
 Team managers: Jukka Ahola & Johanna Sandqvist
 Equipment managers: Riikka Ahola & Timo Nikunen

Team captaincy history 
 Saara Suomikallio, 2018–19 (Mestis)
 Karoliina Rantamäki, 2019–

Head coaches 
 Saara Niemi, 2018–

Awards and honors

Finnish Championship 
  Runners-up (1): 2022
  Third Place (3): 1988, 1989, 2021
Source:

Player awards 
 Noora Räty Award (Rookie of the Year)
 2019–20: Krista Parkkonen
 Marianne Ihalainen Award (Top point scorer)
2022–23: Michaela Pejzlová
2020–21: Michaela Pejzlová
 Tiia Reima Award (Top goal scorer)
 2021–22: Matilda Nilsson

 Sari Fisk Award (Best plus–minus)
 2022–23: Michaela Pejzlová
 Emma Laaksonen Award (Fair-play player)
 2021–22: Emmanuelle Passard

 Hannu Saintula Award (Coach of the Year)
2020–21: Saara Niemi
 Scholar-Athlete Award
 2022–23: Michaela Pejzlová
 2020–21: Anni Hietaharju

All-Stars 
 Naisten Liiga All-Star Second Team
 2021–22: Iina Kuusela (G), Matilda Nilsson (RW), Krista Parkkonen (D), Michaela Pejzlová (C)
 2020–21: Athéna Locatelli (D), Krista Parkkonen (D), Michaela Pejzlová (C)

Player of the Month 
 January 2023: Emilia Vesa
 October 2022: Julia Liikala
 December 2019: Emmanuelle Passard

Team records 
The individual records detailed here include statistics since the team joined the Naisten Liiga in the 2019–20 season only, as complete player statistics for HIFK Naiset during the 1982–1989 Naisten SM-sarja seasons are not available. Records valid through the conclusion of the 2021–22 season.

Single-season records
 Most goals in a season: Matilda Nilsson, 37 goals (29 games; 2021–22)
 Most assists in a season: Michaela Pejzlová, 27 assists (21 games; 2021–22)
 Most points in a season: Matilda Nilsson, 55 points (29 games; 2021–22)
 Most points in a season, defenceman: Caroline Shaunessy, 27 points (30 games; 2019–20)
 Most points in a season, rookie: Krista Parkkonen, 21 points (28 games; 2019–20)
 Best points per game in a season, over ten games played: Michaela Pejzlová, 2.00 P/G (21 games; 2021–22)
 Most penalty minutes in a season: Krista Parkkonen, 63 PIM (28 games; 2019–20)
 Best save percentage in a season, over ten games played: Iina Kuusela, .951 SV% (18 games; 2021–22)
 Best goals against average in a season, over ten games played: Iina Kuusela, 1.23 GAA (18 games; 2021–22)
 Most shutouts in a season: Iina Kuusela, 6 shutouts (18 games; 2021–22)

Career records 
Statistics valid from 2019–20 season through 2021–22 season.
 Most career goals: Emmanuelle Passard, 65 goals (85 games; 2019–2022)
 Most career assists: Karoliina Rantamäki, 58 assists (74 games; 2019–2022)
 Most career points: Emmanuelle Passard, 120 points (85 games; 2019–2022)
 Most career points, defenceman: Krista Parkkonen, 49 points (69 games; 2019–2022)
 Best career points per game, over 30 games played: Michaela Pejzlová, 1.84 P/G (43 games; 2019–2022)
 Most career penalty minutes: Krista Parkkonen, 75 PIM (69 games; 2019–2022)
 Most games played, skater: Emmanuelle Passard, 85 games (2019–2022)
 Most games played, goaltender: Iina Kuusela, 33 games (2020–2022)

All-time scoring leaders
The top-ten point (goal+assist) scorers since HIFK joined the Naisten Liiga in 2019.

Note: Nat = Nationality; Pos = Position; GP = Games played; G = Goals; A = Assists; Pts = Points; P/G = Points per game

Source(s): Finnish Ice Hockey Association, Elite Prospects

References

External links
  
 
 
 

Naisten Liiga (ice hockey) teams
HIFK
Ice hockey teams in Finland
Women's ice hockey teams in Europe
Sport in Helsinki
HIFK Naiset
1982 establishments in Finland